Julija Živić (Macedonian: Јулија  Живиќ); (born 29 October 2000) is a Macedonian footballer who plays as a defender for Cypriot club Nea Salamis, Rijeka, Ljuboten and the North Macedonia women's national team. Currently plays for Football Club Split.

   Живиќ, Julija  Živić''; born 29 October 2000) is a Macedonian footballer who plays as a defender for Cypriot  club Ljuboten and the North Macedonia women's national team.

References

2000 births
Living people
Women's association football defenders
Macedonian women's footballers
North Macedonia women's international footballers
Nea Salamis Famagusta FC players
Macedonian expatriate footballers
Macedonian expatriate sportspeople in Cyprus
Expatriate women's footballers in Cyprus
ŽFK Dragon 2014 players